Maan Karate is a 2014 Tamil-language sports comedy film written and directed by Krish Thirukumaran. The film was written and co-produced by AR Murugadoss and produced by P. Madhan under banner of Escape Artists Motion Pictures.  It stars Sivakarthikeyan, Hansika Motwani, and Vamsi Krishna, with Sayaji Shinde, Sathish, Shaji Chen, Preethi Shankar, Ashwathy Ravikumar, Rajesh Gopalan, and Vinu Karthik in supporting roles. The soundtrack and background score composed by Anirudh Ravichander, cinematography handled by M. Sukumar, editing by Sreekar Prasad, production designed by A. R. Mohan and stunt choreographed by Dhilip Subbarayan. The film was released theatrically on 4 April 2014 to mixed to positive reviews from critics.

Plot
  
Five IT employees - Santhosh aka "Sandy", Joe, Gokul, Vaishnavi and Nikita - meet a siddhar who has the power to grant wishes to those who request them, during a weekend trip to the Chandragiri forest. Sandy, who is skeptical about the siddhar's powers, asks him for a copy of the Daily Thanthi newspaper dated on the day after Ayudha Puja (no newspapers are printed during Ayudha Puja). To his surprise, the siddhar materialises the requested copy. The IT gang reads the materialised newspaper and find out to their shock that the company which they work for (Satyam Computers) would close down the next day. When this does happen, they accept the credibility of the newspaper and decide to make money through it. While Vaishnavi is reading the paper, she sees an article where one Peter who stays in Royapuram wins a boxing tournament on the day of Ayudha Puja and dedicates the prize money of 2,00,00,000 to the five of them. The IT gang is astounded on reading this news and decide to find this Peter and sponsor him for the boxing tournament, with the hope of getting 2,00,00,000, despite eventually finding out from the boxing association that the cash prize for the tournament champion is only 1,00,000.

The IT gang successfully manages to track down Peter. However, they immediately find out that he is not a boxer but rather an unambitious youth who is absolutely idiotic and unskilled beyond logic, and who just spends his time drinking and roaming around with his best friend, Neruppu Kumar. However, he is in love with a young woman named Yazhini Islam Sethuraman, who is a sports buff. To impress Yazhini, he accepts their offer to participate in the tournament. However, Peter does not show any inclination to train for the tournament and instead uses the IT gang to fulfill his own desires, including winning Yazhini's heart, much to their chagrin. Later, the IT gang finds out that there is another boxer named Peter whose father also works in Royapuram BSNL like the Peter they are sponsoring, but is a 15-time champion boxer who is even nicknamed "Peter the Killer". Thinking that they are sponsoring the wrong Peter, the IT gang approaches "Killer" Peter and offers to sponsor him, but he refuses. They reluctantly decide to continue sponsoring the Peter they are currently sponsoring.

Soon the boxing tournament starts, and Peter somehow manages to win all the preliminary matches by fluke, by using a technique wherein he uses his nimble and agile body to escape being hit by his stronger and more experienced opponents, eventually causing them to inadvertently get disqualified or knocked out. The media give a name for his technique: "Maan Karate", which in English means, "Deer Karate". Peter soon becomes known as "Maan Karate" Peter (to distinguish from "Killer" Peter) and becomes an Internet sensation overnight, winning a lot of fans. Due to Peter's rising popularity, the prize money is raised from 1,00,000 to 2,00,00,000, and AirAsia sponsors the tournament.

Eventually, Peter enters the final of the tournament, where he is to face "Killer" Peter. He becomes upset at this development, fearing that he might be killed by "Killer" Peter due to his lack of boxing skill and also Yazhini's rejection if she finds out he is not a boxer. He tries to avoid fighting in the final through various means, none of which are successful. In a last-ditch attempt, he tries to convince "Killer" Peter to "throw" the match so that he could win and impress Yazhini, but is verbally abused( He gives Peter an offer that Killer will loose in the match but has to send Yazhini to have sex with killer) and physically assaulted by him in response. Hurt at the treatment which "Killer" Peter meted out to him, and Peter begins to train hard for the final with the sole purpose of defeating "Killer" Peter. Meanwhile, unknown to him, the IT gang defects to "Killer" Peter's side after being offered 75,00,000 by "Killer" Peter's father-in-law Fernando, despite Nikita's reservations.

The final takes place on the day of Ayudha Puja. "Killer" Peter immediately gains the upper hand, pummelling Peter with heavy blows. However, Peter is undaunted and continues to put up a brave fight, but he is severely weakened and is soon on the verge of being knocked out. A teary-eyed Yazhini, who has found out from Nikita that Peter is not a boxer, tries to convince him to call off the fight, but he refuses. Peter manages to fight back, eventually knocking out "Killer" Peter, causing a major upset. Peter wins the boxing tournament and dedicates the prize money of 2,00,00,000 to the astounded IT gang, oblivious to their treachery, but they deny the offer. He also publicly conveys his love to a sobbing Yazhini, who is relieved that he has survived.

The movie ends with a display of a portion of the newspaper the siddhar had materialised torn by Nikita and left at the Chandragiri forest several months ago. The portion shows a photo of Maan Karate Peter lifting the boxing tournament trophy.

Cast

 Sivakarthikeyan as "Maan Karate" Peter, a roadside boy who later become a boxer with the help of a team
 Hansika Motwani as Yazhini Sethuraman, Peter's love interest and a sports buff
 Vamsi Krishna as "Killer" Peter, a professional boxer
 Sayaji Shinde as Kalaimamani Sethuraman, Yazhini's father and Tamil professor
 Shaji Chen as Peter's coach
 Sathish as Santhosh "Sandy"
 Preethi Shankar as Vaishnavi
 Ashwathy Ravikumar as Nikitha
 Rajesh Gopalan as Joe
 Vinu Karthik as Gokul
 Tejaswini as "Nancy", Killer Peter's wife 
 Ravi Prakash as Fernando, "Killer" Peter's father-in-law
 Arunraja Kamaraj as Neruppu Kumar, Peter's friend
 Swaminathan as Doctor
 Yogi Babu as Vavvaal, a competitor for Peter to marry Yazhini
 Vikramadithyan as Siddhar
 Rajkumar as Lift Guy
 Mippu as man saying Thirukural
 Soori as Tiger Tyson, Referee for the entertainment boxing matches (cameo appearance)
 Paravai Muniyamma (special appearance in the song "Royapuram Peter")
 Baba Bhaskar (special appearance in the song "Royapuram Peter")
 Louna (special appearance in the song "Maanja")
 AR Murugadoss (special appearance in the song "Open the Tasmac")
 Anirudh Ravichander as himself (special appearance in the song "Open the Tasmac")

Production
A pooja (blessing ceremony) for the launch of the film took place on 10 July, followed by a press meet. The film was shot in Chennai, Bangalore and Athirappilly during the first schedule and a couple of songs were shot at Malta. Hansika started shooting for her portions first while Siva Karthikeyan joined the team from the first week of August.

The film was named after a dialogue spoken by Dhamu in Gemini (2002), where he explains that "Maan Karate" means nothing more than how a deer runs away when in danger.

Soundtrack

The soundtrack for the film was composed by Anirudh Ravichander scoring for the second Sivakarthikeyan film after Ethir Neechal (2013). The audio was launched at Sathyam Cinemas (Chennai) on 16 March 2014. Behindwoods rated the album 3.25/5 stating "Hit machine Anirudh delivers one more with his signature sound".

Release
The film released on 4 April 2014.
The film released in 650 screens worldwide, which is the biggest release in Sivakarthikeyan's career.

Critical Reception
Maan Karate received mixed to positive reviews from critics. Baradwaj Rangan of The Hindu, wrote, "Sivakarthikeyan, the likeable boy next door, has transformed into Sivakarthikeyan, the big star — and Maan Karate is less a film than a ticker-tape celebration of this reality...This isn’t about Maan Karate or even about boxing. It’s about the cult of the star. And as is the case with these movies, some two hours go by during which nothing seems to be at stake. And then we get the last half-hour, soaked in melodramatic sentiment, where everything seems to be at stake".The Times of India gave the film 2.5/5, wrote, "Maan Karate is nothing but a showcase for Sivakarthikeyan...[the film] dispenses with any form of logic, and wants us to take it as it is, no questions asked. The story, by director AR Murugadoss, is a mix of fantasy and romance, but Thirukumaran's script is underdeveloped". Hindustan Times gave it 2/5 and wrote, "Maan Karate has an interesting plot, but the way it is scripted and narrated is illogical...the movie drags you along in its sometimes strong, sometimes weak currents, interspersed with the silliest of songs and the dumbest of dances". IANS gave it 2/5 and wrote, "While the makers present the film as an out-and-out commercial entertainer and that's what it is, you still find Maan Karate meaningless because debutant Thirukumaran only tried to do justice to the hero's image by compromising on the plot. He also takes the audience for granted and gives them a film under the assumption that they will embrace it because it has been written by Murugadoss". Rediff gave the film 2/5 and wrote, "Maan Karate is a letdown by uninspiring direction". The New Indian Express wrote, "With a watchable first half and a disappointing second half, Maan Karate is an average entertainer". Behindwoods gave 2.75/5 and concluded that the film is "Siva Karthikeyan's entertainer to beat the summer heat". Deccan Chronicle gave 2.5/5 and summarised that, "For Sivakarthikeyan and Hansika fans, this movie will prove to be decent entertainer, if not a blockbuster.". Sify stated that the film is "On the whole, a perfect summer outing with your family.". Siddarth Srinivas of Cinemalead gave 2.5/5 and concluded, "This boxer packs a punch which is half as powerful.". Indiaglitz wrote, "Barring the boxing sequences, a good watch!" and rated the movie 2.75/5. Bharath Vijaykumar of Moviecrow gave 2.25/5 and concluded, "Maan Karate is not as smart as the title suggests.". OneIndia gave 2.5/5 and concluded, "Maan Karate is for Sivakarthikeyan and Hansika Motwani's fans.".

Box office
The film collected  on its first day. The film saw a huge drop in its second day by collecting  and on third day it collected . Over its first weekend, the film grossed  selling 1 million tickets worldwide. In Chennai, the film collected .

Dubbed versions and remakes 
It was remade in Telugu as Tuntari. The remake was directed by Kumar Nagendra and produced by Ashok and Nagarjun on Sri Keerthi Films. Nara Rohit and Latha Hegde played the lead roles.

References

External links
 

Indian boxing films
2014 films
Films scored by Anirudh Ravichander
2010s Tamil-language films
Tamil films remade in other languages
2010s sports comedy films
Indian sports comedy films